The men's doubles of the 2018 Advantage Cars Prague Open tournament was played on clay in Prague, Czech Republic.

Jan Šátral and Tristan-Samuel Weissborn were the defending champions but only Šátral chose to defend his title, partnering Jan Mertl. Šátral lost in the quarterfinals to Fernando Romboli and David Vega Hernández.

Sander Gillé and Joran Vliegen won the title after defeating Romboli and Vega Hernández 6–4, 6–2 in the final.

Seeds

Draw

References
 Main Draw

Advantage Cars Prague Open - Men's Doubles
2018 Men's Doubles